Jammu Mail (14033: Old Delhi to Shri Mata Vaishno Devi Katra, 14034: Shri Mata Vaishno Devi Katra to Old Delhi) is a mail train which goes from Delhi to Shri Mata Vaishno Devi Katra. The train runs daily via Panipat, Karnal, Ambala, Ludhiana, Jammu Tawi and Udhampur, covering a distance of 637 km at an average speed of 42 km/hr. The train was extended to Katra from Udhampur on 1 September 2015.

Locomotives
 14033 - Delhi to Katra: WAP-7 Ghaziabad
 14034 - Katra to Delhi: WAP-7 Ghaziabad

Schedule

 Runs Daily from both the side

References

 Indian Rail Info
 Indian Railways

Transport in Katra, Jammu and Kashmir
Transport in Delhi
Named passenger trains of India
Rail transport in Punjab, India
Rail transport in Haryana
Rail transport in Delhi
Rail transport in Jammu and Kashmir
Mail trains in India